Józefowo is a village in the administrative district of Gmina Włocławek, within Włocławek County, Kuyavian-Pomeranian Voivodeship, in north-central Poland.

The village has a population of 200.

History
Jozefowo, Brest Domain Office, Masovian Voivodeship, Laid out in the middle of the forest.

The permission to clear the forest was given to the settlers by the bishop of Kuyavian in 1772 without any privilege. In 1822 the colony by the government of Congress Poland had 220 npoln. Morning and 113 R. received on sections of forest.

Source: Anton Pytlak, The German colonization efforts on the state domains in the Kingdom of Poland from 1793-1864, Verlag Borna-Leipzig 1917

References

Villages in Włocławek County